Chenar-e Sofla (also Romanized as Chenār-e Soflá; also known as Chenār, Chenār-e Sheykh, Chenār Sheykh, Chenār Sheykh-e Soflá, and Chīnār) is a village in Darbandrud Rural District, in the Central District of Asadabad County, Hamadan Province, Iran. At the 2006 census, its population was 3,890, in 1,002 families.

References 

Populated places in Asadabad County